Ira Davenport is the name of:

Ira Davenport (politician) (1841–1904), New York politician
Ira Davenport (athlete) (1887–1941), American athlete and Olympic (1912) bronze medalist
Ira Davenport, spiritualist, one of the Davenport Brothers